Diamond is a village in Grundy and Will Counties, Illinois.  The population was 2,527 at the 2010 census. Terry Kernc is the current mayor of Diamond.

History
A post office called Diamond was established in 1872, and remained in operation until 1909. Black Diamond had its start as a coal town. The village was named for its location in the center of the "Black Diamond" coal district.

On February 16, 1883 the Diamond Mine flooded, killing 72 miners. A monument was erected in Diamond memorializing the event.

On November 17, 2013, an EF-2 tornado hit Diamond.

Geography
Diamond is located at  (41.287699, -88.253824).

Demographics

As of the census of 2000, there were 1,393 people, 551 households, and 406 families residing in the village. The racial makeup of the village was 97.13% White, 0.65% Native American, 0.07% Asian, 0.86% from other races, and 1.29% from two or more races. Hispanic or Latino of any race were 3.52% of the population.

There were 551 households, out of which 36.1% had children under the age of 18 living with them, 53.5% were married couples living together, 14.7% had a female householder with no husband present, and 26.3% were non-families. 21.4% of all households were made up of individuals, and 5.6% had someone living alone who was 65 years of age or older.  The average household size was 2.53 and the average family size was 2.95.

In the village, the population was spread out, with 27.1% under the age of 18, 9.0% from 18 to 24, 30.9% from 25 to 44, 23.0% from 45 to 64, and 9.9% who were 65 years of age or older.  The median age was 35 years. For every 100 females, there were 94.6 males.  For every 100 females age 18 and over, there were 93.7 males.

The median income for a household in the village was $43,750, and the median income for a family was $49,688. Males had a median income of $46,136 versus $24,813 for females. The per capita income for the village was $20,223.  About 5.6% of families and 8.6% of the population were below the poverty line, including 13.2% of those under age 18 and 9.5% of those age 65 or over.

References

External links
Village of Diamond

Villages in Grundy County, Illinois
Villages in Will County, Illinois
Villages in Illinois
1872 establishments in Illinois